The 2004 European Taekwondo Championships were held in Lillehammer, Norway. The event took place from 2 to 5 May, 2004.

Medal summary

Men

Women

References

External links 
 European Taekwondo Union

European Taekwondo Championships
International sports competitions hosted by Norway
2004 in taekwondo
2004 in European sport